Cape Jaffa is a headland in the Australian state of South Australia located at the south end of Lacepede Bay on the state's south east coast about  south west of the town centre of Kingston SE. This settlement includes a jetty fitted with a navigation aid and a marina. The southern coastline of the cape forms part of the Bernouilli Conservation Reserve.

See also
Cape Jaffa Lighthouse

References

External links
Cape Jaffa unpatrolled beach
Kings Camp unpatrolled beach

J
J